Claudius "Claude" Baudoux (7 May 1898 – 17 November 1984) was a Belgian field hockey player who competed in the 1928 Summer Olympics. He was a member of the Belgian field hockey team which finished fourth in the 1928 Olympic tournament. He played all five matches as halfback.

External links
 
Claude Baudoux's profile at Sports Reference.com

1898 births
1984 deaths
Belgian male field hockey players
Olympic field hockey players of Belgium
Field hockey players at the 1928 Summer Olympics